Khodynka may refer to the following:

 Khodynka Field, in Moscow, Russia
 Khodynka Tragedy, 1896
 Khodynka: An Incident of the Coronation of Nicholas II, by Leo Tolstoy, about the tragedy
 Khodynka Arena, a sports facility
 Khodynka Aerodrome, a former airport in Moscow

See also

 Khodynka Cup of Sorrows, Russian Tsar Nicholas II coronation cup